King's Lynn, known until 1537 as Bishop’s Lynn and colloquially as Lynn, is a port and market town in the borough of King's Lynn and West Norfolk in the county of Norfolk, England.

History

Toponymy
The etymology of King's Lynn is uncertain. The name Lynn may signify a body of water near the town – the Welsh word  means a lake; but the name is plausibly of Anglo-Saxon origin, from lean meaning a tenure in fee or farm. As the 1085 Domesday Book mentions saltings at Lena (Lynn), an area of partitioned pools may have existed there at the time. Other places with Lynn in the name include Dublin, Ireland.  An Dubh Linn....the Black Pool.   The presence of salt, which was relatively rare and expensive in the early medieval period, may have added to the interest of Herbert de Losinga and other prominent Normans in the modest parish.

The town was named Len  (Bishop's Lynn) while under the temporal and spiritual jurisdiction of the Bishop of Norwich, but in the reign of Henry VIII it was surrendered to the crown and took the name Lenne  or King's Lynn. Domesday records it as Lun and Lenn, and ascribes it to the Bishop of Elmham and the Archbishop of Canterbury.

The town is generally known locally as Lynn.

The city of Lynn, Massachusetts, north of Boston, was named in 1637 in honour of its first official minister of religion, Reverend Samuel Whiting Sr, who arrived there from Lynn, Norfolk.

Middle Ages
Lynn originated on a constricted site south of where the River Great Ouse now discharges into the Wash. Development began in the early 10th century, but the place was not recorded until the early 11th century. Until the early 13th century, the Great Ouse emptied via the Wellstream at Wisbech. After its redirection, Lynn and its port gained significance and prosperity.

In 1101, Bishop Herbert de Losinga of Thetford began to build the first medieval town between the rivers Purfleet to the north and Mill Fleet to the south. He commissioned St Margaret's Church and authorised a market to be held on Saturday. Trade built up along the waterways that stretched inland; the town expanded between the two rivers.

Lynn's 12th-century Jewish community was exterminated in the widespread massacres of 1189.

During the 14th century, Lynn ranked as England's most important port. It was seen to be as vital to England in the Middle Ages as Liverpool was during the Industrial Revolution. Sea trade with Europe was dominated by the Hanseatic League of ports; the transatlantic trade and the rise of England's western ports began only in the 17th century. The Trinity Guildhall was rebuilt in 1421 after a fire. Walls entered by the South Gate and East Gate were erected to protect the town. It retains two former Hanseatic League warehouses: Hanse House of 1475 and Marriott's Warehouse, in use between the 15th and 17th centuries. These are the only remaining buildings of the Hanseatic League in England.

Modern

In the first decade of the 16th century, Thoresby College was built in Lynn by Thomas Thoresby to house priests of the Guild of The Holy Trinity. It had been incorporated in 1453 under a petition of its alderman, chaplain, four brethren and four sisters, who were licensed to found a chantry of chaplains for the altar of Holy Trinity in Wisbech. Lands were granted in mortmain. Lynn acquired a mayor and corporation in 1524. In 1537 the king took over the town from the bishop. In the same century the town's two annual fairs were reduced to one. In 1534 a grammar school was founded; four years later Henry VIII closed the Benedictine priory and the three friaries.

A piped water supply was created in the 16th century, although many could not afford to connect to the elm pipes carrying water under the streets. Lynn suffered from outbreaks of plague, notably in 1516, 1587, 1597, 1636 and finally in 1665. Fire was another hazard – in 1572 thatched roofs were banned to reduce the risk. In the English Civil War, King's Lynn supported Parliament, but in August 1643 it was in Royalist hands. It changed sides again after Parliament sent an army and the town was besieged for three weeks. Valentine Walton brother-in-law of Oliver Cromwell was appointed governor.

A heart carved on the wall of the Tuesday Market Place supposedly  marks the burning of an alleged witch, Margaret Read, in 1590. It is said that as she was burning her heart burst from her body and struck the wall. Other sources put forward Mary Smith, hanged in 1616, as the witch.

In 1683, the architect Henry Bell, once the town's mayor, designed the Custom House. He also designed the Duke's Head Inn, North Runcton Church and Stanhoe Hall, having gained ideas while on travel in Europe as a young man.

In the 16th and 17th centuries, the town's main export was grain. Lynn was no longer a major international port, but iron and timber were imported. King's Lynn suffered from the discovery of the Americas, which benefited ports on the west coast of England. It was also affected by the growth of London.

In the late 17th century, imports of wine from Spain, Portugal and France boomed, and there was still much coastal trade. It was cheaper to transport goods by water than by road at the time. Large amounts of coal arrived from the north-east of England.

The Fens began to be drained in the mid–17th century and the land turned to farming, allowing vast amounts of produce to be sent to London's growing market. Meanwhile, King's Lynn was still a major fishing port. Greenland Fishery House in Bridge Street was built in 1605. By the late 17th century shipbuilding and glass-making had also developed.

In the early 18th century, Daniel Defoe called the town "beautiful, well built and well situated". Shipbuilding thrived, as did associated trades such as sail-making and rope-making. Glass-making prospered; brewing was another important industry. The Norwich company of comedians had been visiting since the 1750s, in 1766 a permanent theatre was created. A new playhouse was built in 1805. The first bank in King's Lynn opened in 1784.

A fearsome example of penal brutality occurred on 28 September 1708, when a seven-year-old boy, Michael Hammond, and his 11-year-old sister Ann were convicted of stealing a loaf of bread and sentenced to hanging. Their public executions took place near the South Gates. The Member of Parliament at the time was Sir Robert Walpole, generally regarded as the first Prime Minister of the United Kingdom.

The town's decline from the late 17th century was reversed by the arrival of the railways in 1847, mainly by the Great Eastern Railway, later the London and North Eastern Railway, running to Hunstanton, Dereham and Cambridge. The town was also served by the Midland and Great Northern Joint Railway (M&GN), with offices at Austin Street and a station at South Lynn (now dismantled), which was also its operational control centre. It relocated to Melton Constable. The M&GN lines across Norfolk closed to passengers in February 1959.

The town's amenities continued to improve in the 20th century. A museum opened in 1904 and a public library in 1905. The first cinema, the Majestic, officially opened on 23 May 1928. (The year is marked in a stained-glass window on the front of the building.) The town council began a programme of regeneration in the 1930s.

During the First World War, King's Lynn was one of the UK's first towns to suffer aerial bombing, on the night of 19 January 1915 by a naval Zeppelin, L4 (LZ 27), commanded by Captain Lieutenant Magnus von Platen-Hallermund. Eleven bombs were dropped, both incendiary and high explosive, doing much damage, killing two people in Bentinck Street and injuring several more. When the Second World War began in 1939, it was assumed that King's Lynn would be safe from bombing and many evacuees were sent from London, but the town suffered several raids.

The local breweries had closed by the 1950s, but new industries included food canning in the 1930s and soup-making in the 1950s. In the 1960s, the council sought to encourage development by adding an industrial estate at Hardwick. The new trades arriving included light engineering, clothing and chemicals. Fishing remained important.

In 1962, King's Lynn was classed as an overflow town for London. The population grew and estates were built at Woottons and Gaywood. The town centre was redeveloped in the 1960s and many earlier buildings knocked down. Lynnsport, a sports centre, opened in 1982. The corn exchange became a theatre in 1996.

Recent changes

Since 2004, work has been under way to regenerate the town under a multi-million-pound scheme. The 1960s Vancouver Shopping Centre (now the Vancouver Quarter) was refurbished in 2005 under the scheme, but was expected to last only 25 years, according to the construction firm, even with a planned extension. An award-winning £6 million multi-storey car park was built.

To the south of the town, residential housing appeared on a large area of brownfield land. Plans for another housing estate alongside the River Nar were opposed locally and halted by the economic situation. There is also a business park, parkland, a school, shops and a new relief road in a £300 million-plus scheme.

In 2006, King's Lynn became the United Kingdom's first member of The Hanse (Die Hanse), a network of towns across Europe that belonged historically to the Hanseatic League. The league was an influential medieval trading association of merchant towns around the Baltic Sea and the North Sea, which contributed to Lynn's development.

The Borough Council commissioned and accepted a 2008 report by DTZ that dubbed King's Lynn's workforce as "low-value" with a "low skills base" and the town as having a "poor lifestyle offer". The quality of services and amenities was "unattractive to higher-value inward investors and professional employees with higher disposable incomes". Average earnings were well below regional and national levels, and many jobs in tourism, leisure and hotels were subject to seasonal fluctuations and likewise poorly paid. Education and workforce skills were described as below the national average. The borough ranked 150th out of 354 for social deprivation.

In 2009, a proposal was made for the Campbell's Meadow factory site to be redeveloped as a  employment and business park. In June 2011 Tesco gained a permit for a superstore. On 8 June 2010, it unveiled regeneration plans that would cost £32 million and were billed to bring 900 new jobs. Tesco pledged £4 million of improvements in other areas of the town. While it planned to spend £1.6 million widening Hardwick Road, the Sainsbury's bid was preferred by the Council as offering the town more benefits.

Sainsbury's £40 million plans for a superstore opposite Tesco on the Pinguin Foods site yielded an estimated 300 jobs. This was the key to securing the future of Pinguin Foods in King's Lynn. Pinguin Foods released  of its  site to accommodate the proposed store. Mortson Assets' and Sainsbury's plan included a link road between Scania Way and Queen Elizabeth Way to improve access and allow the industrial estate to attract new employers, while Sainsbury's maintains its store in the town centre. It has pledged £1.75 million for highways improvements and a further £7 million to invest in the Pinguin Foods factory.

At 8 am on 15 January 2012, the landmark Campbell's Tower was demolished – competition winner Sarah Griffiths pulled the switch. Her father, Mick Locke, had died in 1995 aged 52 after being scalded by steam at the factory. It was Campbell's first UK factory when it opened in the 1950s. At its peak in the early 1990s it employed over 700.

A fire station was opened by Queen Elizabeth II in February 2015.

Governance
King's Lynn became a municipal borough in 1883. The present Borough of King's Lynn and West Norfolk was an amalgamation of the Borough of King's Lynn, the urban districts of Downham Market and Hunstanton, and the rural districts of Docking, Downham, Freebridge Lynn, and Marshland.

Heraldry

The shield in the coat of arms of King's Lynn and West Norfolk that of the ancient Borough of Lynn, recorded at the College of Arms in 1563. It shows the legend of Margaret of Antioch, who has appeared on Lynn shields since the 13th century, and to whom the parish church is dedicated.

The per chevron division and addition of a bordure serve to distinguish the shield from its predecessor, while retaining its medieval simplicity. The bordure also suggests the wider bounds of the new authority, with the seven parts symbolising the seven amalgamated authorities. The gull on the crest is a maritime reference. It has appeared as a supporter in some representations, but officially stands on a bollard to make it distinctive. It supports a crown or coronet like a King's Lynn supporter and a lion from the crest of Downham Market. 
The coronet refers to the Borough's royal connections. The cross held by the gull is an extension of the two in the shield, and the cross in the coat of arms of Freebridge Lynn Rural District.

The supporters are based on the crest of the Hunstanton Urban District Council. The lion is a variation of the lions, or leopards, in the Royal Coat of Arms of the United Kingdom and its fish tail suggests the borough's links with the sea. The fish–lion is also the central feature in the borough's badge, but here it is surrounded by a garland of oak leaves as a reference to the rural nature of much of the district. Oak leaves also appear in the coronet in the crest of the former Downham Market Urban District Council.

Twinning
King's Lynn is twinned with: 
 Emmerich am Rhein, Germany
 Sandringham, Victoria, Australia
 Jičín, Hradec Králové, Czechia
 Mladá Boleslav, Central Bohemian Region, Czechia

Geography

Topography

The much smaller Gaywood River also flows through the town, joining the Great Ouse at the southern end of South Quay, close to the town centre. A small section known as West Lynn lies on the west bank, linked to the town centre by one of the oldest ferries in the country. Other districts of King's Lynn include the town centre, North Lynn, South Lynn, and Gaywood.

Climate
King's Lynn has a temperate oceanic climate (Köppen: Cfb).

Typically all these figures are marginally lower than those for the southern half of the Fens due to the presence of onshore sea breezes, and occasional haar (cold sea fog), especially in early summer and late spring. However, with a strong enough offshore breeze, the area can be notably warm. Terrington (along with Cambridge Botanical Gardens) achieved the national highest temperature of 2007, 

A total of 41.6 nights will report an air frost at Terrington and 51.9 nights at Marham.

All averages refer to the 30-year observation period 1971–2000.

Parks
The largest of the town's several public parks are the Walks, a historic 17-hectare urban park in the centre of King's Lynn. They are the only town walk in Norfolk to survive from the 18th century. The Heritage Lottery Fund donated £4.3 million towards restoring them and adding modern amenities. They also include the Red Mount, a Grade II-listed 15th-century chapel. In 1998, the Walks were designated by English Heritage as a Grade II national historic park.

The Walks as a whole had a different, earlier origin, conceived of not as a municipal park, as one understands the term today, but as a promenade for citizens, away from the smell, grime and bustle of the town centre. Harding's Pits form another public park, to the south of the town. This informal area of open space with large public sculptures was laid out to reflect the town's history. Harding's Pits are managed by local volunteers under a management firm, which successfully fought off a Borough Council attempts to turn them into an attenuation drain.

Demography
In 2007, King's Lynn had a population of 42,800. At Norfolk's 2007 census, King's Lynn, together with West Norfolk, had a population of 143,500, with an average population density of 1.0 persons per hectare. For figures after 2011 see King's Lynn and West Norfolk.

Economy
King's Lynn has always been a centre for fishing and seafood (especially inshore prawns, shrimps and cockles). There have also been glass-making and small-scale engineering works – many fairground and steam engines were built here. It still contains much farm-related industry, including food processing. There are several chemical factories and the town retains a role as an import centre. In general, it is a regional centre for a still sparsely populated part of England.

King's Lynn was the fastest growing port in Great Britain in 2008. Department for Transport figures show that through-put increased by 33 per cent.

In 2008, the German Palm Group began to erect one of the world's largest paper machines, constructed by Voith Paper. With a web speed of up to 2000 metres a minute and a web width of 10.63 metres, it can produce 400,000 tons a year of newsprint paper, based on 100-per-cent recycled paper. The start-up was on 21 August 2009.

The Port of King's Lynn has facilities for dry bulk cargo such as cereals and liquid bulk products such as petroleum products for Pace Petroleum. It also handles timber imported from Scandinavia and the Baltics and has handling sheds for steel imports.

King's Lynn is the prime retail centre in West Norfolk. The town centre is dominated by budget shops, reflecting the spending power of much of the population. The town centre fulfils a leisure role with entertainment centres, bars and restaurants, and has a range of service functions. It provides about 5,300 retailing jobs.

The town centre has 73,000 sq. m. of retail floor space in 347 shops, which exceeds the comparable centres of Bury St Edmunds and Boston. However, whilst the percentage of floor space in comparison shopping and that occupied by multiple retailers is above the national average, King's Lynn offers a more limited range of choice.

Tourism in King's Lynn is a minor industry, but it attracts visitors to its historic centre, and as a base for visiting Sandringham House and other country houses in the area. Within the town and across the nearby Fenland are some of the finest historic churches in Britain, built in a period when King's Lynn and its hinterland were wealthy from trade and wool.

Transport

Roads
King's Lynn is linked to the cities of Norwich and Peterborough by the A47, to Cambridge by the A10, and to Spalding and the North via the A17. Parts of north and east Norfolk are reached by the A148 and the A149.

Railway

King's Lynn railway station, terminus of the Fen Line, is the sole railway facility in King's Lynn. It provides regular services to Cambridge and London King's Cross. South Lynn railway station closed to passengers in 1959, as did Hunstanton in 1969.

West Norfolk Council is still considering ostensibly reopening a railway between King's Lynn and Hunstanton. The possibility was proposed at a meeting of the council's Regeneration and Environment Panel on 29 October 2008, having last been discussed in the 1990s. An environmental case was made for reviving the line to relieve road congestion.

Buses
Nearly all Stagecoach services in the area have been withdrawn, leaving most services in King's Lynn operated by Lynx or Go To Town (West Norfolk Community Transport Project).

King's Lynn is served by the excel bus route between Peterborough and Norwich operated by First Eastern Counties. The Coasthopper route from King's Lynn runs round the Norfolk Coast to Cromer, but since Stagecoach withdrew from Norfolk, the western section has been run by Lynx as Coastliner 36 and extended inland from Wells-next-the-Sea to Fakenham. The Wells–Cromer section is run by Sanders Coaches and still known as Coasthopper, but now extends inland to North Walsham.

South Transport Project

A £7 million programme to redevelop the infrastructure of the town centre in the 2010s was largely provided by the Community Infrastructure Fund. The department programme is a collection of smaller developments, which are detailed below.

Work on a cycle and bus route between the town centre and South Lynn began in June 2010, at a cost of £850,000. It is 720 metres long, from Morston Drift to Millfleet, with buses in both directions, and features a separate path for pedestrians and bicycles, which coincides with the bus route when crossing the Nar sluice. As part of the development, the Millfleet–St James' Road junction is being developed.

A contraflow lane for bicycles was proposed, but not built along Norfolk Street from Albert Street to Blackfriars Road. This would have included a development of the Norfolk Road/Railway Road junction to better accommodate buses and bicycles. Similar work was to have taken place at the Norfolk Street–Littleport Street junction, so that buses would not get caught in the town-centre gyratory system.

Bus priority measures have been added to four sets of traffic lights along St James' Road. These give buses quicker access to the town centre and normalise journey times.

Southgates Roundabout has been redeveloped. Many of its approach roads have been widened in the run-up to the junction and the road markings redone in an attempt to improve lane discipline. Southgates Roundabout is a noted congestion hot spot.

Other small developments are taking place to make junctions more car-friendly.

Media
King's Lynn has two local newspapers; the twice-weekly Lynn News owned by Iliffe Media, and Your Local Paper, a free weekly. KL magazine is a free lifestyle magazine that promotes the best of west and north Norfolk. It has been published monthly since October 2010 and is distributed to local businesses. It also issues special Food and Home Design & Build editions.

King's Lynn is served by BBC Radio Norfolk, Greatest Hits Radio West Norfolk, Radio West Norfolk, KL1 Radio and all national BBC radio stations. The local college has a web-based TV station run by media students, entitled SpringboardTV.com, and holds an awards ceremony at the end of each academic year.

Television services are provided by BBC East, BBC Yorkshire and Lincolnshire, ITV Anglia, and ITV Yorkshire.

Education
Three of King's Lynn four secondary schools are located in the town: King Edward VII School, the King's Lynn Academy and Springwood High School. The fourth, St Clements High School, is in the nearby village of Terrington St Clement. The first is known for its physical education department, King's Lynn Academy for its maths and IT specialities, and Springwood for performing arts and drama. The nearest independent school is Wisbech Grammar School in Cambridgeshire.

The town's further education college, the College of West Anglia, was founded in 1894 as King's Lynn Technical School. In 1973, it was renamed Norfolk College of Arts and Technology, and, in 1998, merged with Cambridgeshire College of Agriculture and Horticulture, which added campuses in Wisbech (now closed) and Milton; it changed the name to the College of West Anglia. It retained this name in April 2006, when it merged with the Isle College in Wisbech.

Culture

St George's Guildhall

The Guild of St George was founded in 1376 and acquired land for the Guildhall of St George in 1406, which was in use by 1428. It offered plays in the Guildhall, the first known being a nativity play in January 1445. This makes it the UK's oldest working theatre.

The Guildhall was used for meetings, dinners and performance until 1547, when King Edward VI dissolved the Guilds. It then became the property of Lynn Corporation and known as the Common Town Hall. Research by the University of East Anglia confirms as probable the oral history of King's Lynn that William Shakespeare performed in the Guildhall in 1593. This is the only still-working theatre in the world that can credibly claim to have hosted Shakespeare. In 1766, Guildhall shows were so popular that a new interior was built inside the present structure, probably on the earlier footprint. By 1945, the Guildhall was almost derelict and in danger of demolition. It was bought by Alexander Penrose, who gave it to the National Trust in 1951. The Pilgrim Trust, Arts Council and public subscription led to conversion into an Arts Centre. Queen Elizabeth the Queen Mother opened it in July 1951 and launched the King's Lynn Festival.

Today, the Guildhall is owned by the National Trust and leased to the Borough Council of King's Lynn and West Norfolk. Various groups hire the building for a year-round programme of theatre, dance, music, lectures and film; amongst them are Shakespeare's Guildhall Trust, King's Lynn Festival, King's Lynn Community Cinema Club. Shakespeare's Guildhall Trust have volunteers who open the theatre to visitors.

Arts
Composer Ralph Vaughan Williams visited King's Lynn in January 1905 and collected several folk songs from the area.

Ruth, Lady Fermoy, a concert pianist, moved to King's Lynn in 1931 as the bride of Lord Edmund Fermoy, who would become the town mayor and local MP. She helped to organise concerts of high-standard professional music.

In 1951, Lady Fermoy complemented the Festival of Britain with a King's Lynn Festival of the Arts. She was a friend and lady-in-waiting to Queen Elizabeth – later the Queen Mother – who agreed to become the festival patron and, in July 1951, officially opened the restored St George's Guildhall. She remained an enthusiastic and active supporter and patron of the festival until her death in March 2002.

The King's Lynn Festival remains the premier music and arts festival in West Norfolk. It is primarily known for classical music, but also hosts jazz, choral, folk, opera, dance, films, talks and exhibitions, along with fringe events each year.

The King's Lynn Literature Festivals are held on single weekends in March (fiction) and September (poetry) each year, usually in the town hall. The Annual Hanse Festival first took place in 2009.

Displays
Storeys of Lynn Museum opened in March 2016, as part of the King's Lynn Town Hall complex. Set within the newly-revealed vaulted undercroft of the 15th-century Trinity Guildhall, it presents the town's collection in an extensive, nationally significant interactive and multi-media exhibition. True's Yard Fisherfolk Museum displays the social history of the North End fishermen, run by volunteers. It includes a cottage and a smokehouse. Since 2013, there has been a local award-winning Military Museum operated by The Bridge for Heroes Charity to raise funds. Lynn Museum, run by Norfolk Museums Service in Market Street, covers the town's local history and the Bronze Age timber circle Seahenge.

Festival Too is held in Tuesday Market Place each summer. Performers have included Midge Ure, Deacon Blue, Suzi Quatro, 10cc, Mungo Jerry, the Human League, the Buzzcocks, M People, Atomic Kitten, Kieran Woodcock, S Club and Beverley Knight.

The Majestic Cinema in the town centre is the town's only cinema.

King's Lynn's main venue for concerts, stand-up comedy shows and other live events is the Corn Exchange, in Tuesday Market Place. Many smaller venues such as Bar Red and the Wenns contribute to the local music scene, along with acts from other parts of the country.

Mart

In the 16th century, King's Lynn's Tuesday Market Place hosted two trade fairs that attracted visitors from as far as Italy and Germany. As the importance of such fairs declined, the Mart has become a funfair, reduced to a single fortnight's annual event that begins on 14 February (Valentine's Day). It is also a memorial to Frederick Savage, who partnered the Showmen's Guild of Great Britain to develop new funfair attractions.

Sport
King's Lynn Town has been playing from the 2021–22 season in the National League. It was formed in 2010, after the original King's Lynn F.C. was wound up in December 2009. Its home games are played at the Walks Stadium in Tennyson Road.

King's Lynn's speedway team, the King's Lynn Stars, races at the Adrian Flux Arena in Saddlebow Road. The track has been run since 1965 on an open licence. It hosted Speedway-type events in the 1950s.

One of the town's basketball clubs, King's Lynn Fury, previously played in the National League out of Lynnsport and represented the town in national competitions from 2004 to 2017. Lynn Nets, formed in 2008, also runs a programme in local competitions.

The historic hockey team The Pelicans, dating from 1920, currently plays at Lynnsport, having been based in nearby North Runcton until 1996.

Notable people

Location

In popular culture
Ruth Galloway, fictional heroine of Elly Griffiths' novels, is a forensic anthropologist living in a cottage near King's Lynn and teaching at the University of North Norfolk.

Peter Grainger's DC Smith Investigation series of detective novels is set in "Kings Lake", a thinly-disguised King's Lynn.

The fictional comedy character Alan Partridge was born in Queen Elizabeth Hospital, King's Lynn. The character itself, played by Steve Coogan, grew up in Norwich and frequently makes references to Norfolk.

Media appearances
King's Lynn and surroundings have since the early 20th century been popular with film and TV producers. Their architecture and landscape often allow them to stand in for other parts of the world, especially the Netherlands and France. The town appeared as the Netherlands in The Silver Fleet (1943) and One of Aircraft Is Missing (1942), as Germany in Operation Crossbow in 1965, and as France in 'Allo 'Allo!, the long-running BBC comedy.

The town served as an earlier Dutch New York in the 1985 feature film Revolution. The BBC series Lovejoy also used the town, as did the Anglia Television series Tales Of The Unexpected and the Granada series Sherlock Holmes, starring Jeremy Brett in the title role.

In the early 2000s, the BBC used the town bus station, local roads and the nearby Royal estate of Sandringham in the comedy drama series Grass, featuring Simon Day. It has, in recent times, appeared many times on programmes such as the BBC's Antiques Road Trip, Flog It!, and a BBC Four documentary The Last Journey of the Magna Carta King, following the trail of John, King of England and how he lost his treasure in the Wash.

King's Lynn Minster (St Margaret's)
King's Lynn Power Station
List of buildings in King's Lynn
List of people from King's Lynn

Further reading

References

External links

Information from Genuki Norfolk
History of medieval Lynn

 
Towns in Norfolk
Market towns in Norfolk
Ports and harbours of Norfolk
Port cities and towns of the North Sea
Populated places on the River Great Ouse
Trading posts of the Hanseatic League
Unparished areas in Norfolk
King's Lynn and West Norfolk